The Budos Band is an American instrumental band from Staten Island, New York, formed in 2005. AllMusic describes the group as a "doom rock Afro-soul big band with a '70s touch" that joins "musical universes from trippy psychedelia and Afro-funk to '70s hard rock and late-'60s soul." They have described themselves as "70's Psychedelic Instrumental Music," and "Afro-soul inspired by Ethiopian music with a soul undercurrent" and "sprinkled a little bit of sweet 60's stuff on top." One reviewer described the band as “sounding as if Quentin Tarantino was the music supervisor for a Bond film". Their more recent albums have incorporated sounds from 1970s jazz, funk, Afro-Beat, underground rock, and proto-metal. They have been signed to Daptone Records throughout their career.

History

The Budos Band originated at a jam session hosted by the New York band Antibalas. Some of the participants decided to form the new band, which has consisted of an occasionally floating lineup featuring David Guy and Andrew Greene (trumpets), Cochemea Gastelum (tenor sax), Jared Tankel (baritone sax), Dame Rodriguez and Vincent Balestrino (percussion), Thomas Brenneck (guitar), Robert Lombardo (congas), Mike Deller (organ), Daniel Foder (bass), and Brian Profilio and John Carbonella Jr. (drums). Their self-titled debut album was released in 2005 and featured guest appearances by Bosco Mann and Neal Sugarman.

The Budos Band II and The Budos Band III were released in 2007 and 2010, respectively. During this period the band members, in various permutations, backed several other acts associated with the Daptone label, including an acclaimed appearance on "Changes" by Charles Bradley. The fourth Budos Band album, Burnt Offering, was released in 2014 and was noted for incorporating elements from hard rock and heavy metal. The band was saddened by the deaths of labelmates Sharon Jones in 2016 and Charles Bradley in 2017, with some members moving to other states and starting families.

In 2019 some of the members reconvened to write and record their fifth album, Budos Band V.  The album was further noted by critics for its diverse influences, being described by Kerrang! as "cinematic yet menacing, the soundtrack to a bad drug trip in the desert in a blaxploitation flick." The album also received positive reviews from Rolling Stone and New Noise. The latter described the Budos Band as "one [of] the best bands out there today. They bring a familiar vibe while standing defiantly unique." Their sixth album, Long in the Tooth, was released on October 9, 2020.

Discography

Studio albums
The Budos Band (Daptone Records, 2005)
The Budos Band II (Daptone Records, 2007)
The Budos Band III (Daptone Records, 2010)
Burnt Offering (Daptone Records, 2014)
The Budos Band V (Daptone Records, 2019)
Long in the Tooth (Daptone Records, 2020)

EPs
The Budos Band EP (Daptone Records, 2009)
The Shape of Mayhem to Come (Live, Daptone Records, 2016)

Singles
 "Up from the South" / "T.I.B.W.F." (2005)
 "The Proposition" / "Ghost Walk" (2007)
 "More Mess on My Thing" / "Budos Theme" (with The Poets of Rhythm) (2006)
 "Day Tripper" / "Money" (with Sharon Jones & The Dap Kings) (2010)
 "Kakal" / "Hidden Hand" (2010)
 "Burnt Offering" / "Seizure" (2014)
 "Magus Mountain" / "Vertigo" (2015)
 "Maelstrom" / "Avalanche" (2019)
 "Gun Metal Grey" / "Long In The Tooth" (2020)

Other appearances
 "Up From the South" is featured in a commercial for the NFL Network (2013).
 "T.I.B.W.F." is featured in a series of commercials for 1800 Tequila and in the sixth episode of This American Life.
 "The Chicago Falcon (Remix)" is featured on Wale's fourth mixtape, The Mixtape About Nothing (2008).
 "Budos Rising" and "The Proposition" are featured in MLB 09: The Show and MLB 10: The Show, respectively, for PlayStation consoles.
 "King Charles" is featured in episode 37 of the HBO TV series Entourage ("Manic Monday," Season 3).
 "Origin of Man," "Up From The South," "T.I.B.W.F." and "Hidden Hand" are featured in the movie New York, I Love You (2009).
 "Mas o Menos", "Ride or Die" and "Scorpion" are featured on the fictional radio station "Daptone Radio" in the game Sleeping Dogs by United Front Games and Square Enix London. (2012).
 "The Volcano Song" is featured in the documentary I Knew It Was You: Rediscovering John Cazale (2009).
 "The Sticks" is featured in the background of a trailer for Destiny's Dark Below DLC. (2014)
 "Say Amen (Saturday Night)" by Panic! At The Disco features an interpolation of "Aphasia" off of the album Burnt Offering.
 "Unbroken, unshaven" is the theme music for the Secretly Incredibly Fascinating podcast, hosted by comedian and writer Alex Schmidt. Another Budos Band song, "Chicago Falcon" was the theme music during Schmidt's tenure with The Cracked Podcast.
"Spider Web, Pt. 1" is used as the soundtrack for the majority of Ollie Lock's part in the Skateboardcafe video, "IMPRESSIONS."
"Old Engine Oil", "Black Venom", and "Aphasia" are featured in The Bear (TV series) in 2022.

Band members
 Jared Tankel – baritone saxophone
Thomas Brenneck – electric guitar
 John Carbonella Jr. – congas, drums
 Mike Deller – organ
 Daniel Foder – bass guitar
 Andrew Greene – trumpet
 Rob Lombardo – bongos, congas
 Brian Profilio – drums
 Dame Rodriguez – percussion

References

External links
Official website
Daptone Records website
Review of the Budos Band II
Interview with The Budos Band

American funk musical groups
Musical groups from Staten Island
Daptone Records artists